Homemade Jam was a Canadian music television miniseries which aired on CBC Television in 1975.

Premise
This Edmonton-produced series featured Bob Ruzicka as host.

Scheduling
This half-hour series was broadcast on Tuesdays at 9:30 p.m. from 24 June to 22 July 1975.

See also
 Ruzicka (TV series)

References

External links
 

CBC Television original programming
1975 Canadian television series debuts
1975 Canadian television series endings
Television shows filmed in Edmonton
1970s Canadian music television series